Gerdin or Gardin in Iran may refer to:
 Gerdin, Jebalbarez
 Gardin, Sarduiyeh